Authoritarianism is a political system characterized by the rejection of political plurality, the use of strong central power to preserve the political status quo, and reductions in the rule of law, separation of powers, and democratic voting. Political scientists have created many typologies describing variations of authoritarian forms of government. Authoritarian regimes may be either autocratic or oligarchic and may be based upon the rule of a party or the military. States that have a blurred boundary between democracy and authoritarianism have some times been characterized as "hybrid democracies", "hybrid regimes" or "competitive authoritarian" states.

The political scientist Juan Linz, in an influential 1964 work, An Authoritarian Regime: Spain, defined authoritarianism as possessing four qualities:

 Limited political pluralism, is realized with constraints on the legislature, political parties and interest groups.
 Political legitimacy is based upon appeals to emotion and identification of the regime as a necessary evil to combat "easily recognizable societal problems, such as underdevelopment or insurgency."
 Minimal political mobilization, and suppression of anti-regime activities.
 Ill-defined executive powers, often vague and shifting extend the power of the executive.

Minimally defined, an authoritarian government lacks free and competitive direct elections to legislatures, free and competitive direct or indirect elections for executives, or both. Broadly defined, authoritarian states include countries that lack civil liberties such as freedom of religion, or countries in which the government and the opposition do not alternate in power at least once following free elections. Authoritarian states might contain nominally democratic institutions such as political parties, legislatures and elections which are managed to entrench authoritarian rule and can feature fraudulent, non-competitive elections. In contexts of democratic backsliding,  scholars tend to identify authoritarian political leaders based on certain tactics, such as: politicizing independent institutions, spreading disinformation, aggrandizing executive power, quashing dissent, targeting vulnerable communities, stoking violence, and corrupting elections. Since 1946, the share of authoritarian states in the international political system increased until the mid-1970s but declined from then until the year 2000.

Characteristics 
Authoritarianism is characterized by highly concentrated and centralized government power maintained by political repression and the exclusion of potential challengers. It uses political parties and mass organizations to mobilize people around the goals of the regime. Adam Przeworski has theorized that "authoritarian equilibrium rests mainly on lies, fear and economic prosperity." However, Daniel A. Bell and Wang Pei used China's experience with COVID-19 to argue that the categories are not so clear cut.

Authoritarianism also tends to embrace the informal and unregulated exercise of political power, a leadership that is "self-appointed and even if elected cannot be displaced by citizens' free choice among competitors", the arbitrary deprivation of civil liberties and little tolerance for meaningful opposition. A range of social controls also attempt to stifle civil society while political stability is maintained by control over and support of the armed forces, a bureaucracy staffed by the regime and creation of allegiance through various means of socialization and indoctrination.

Authoritarianism is marked by "indefinite political tenure" of the ruler or ruling party (often in a one-party state) or other authority. The transition from an authoritarian system to a more democratic form of government is referred to as democratization.

Constitutions in authoritarian regimes 
Authoritarian regimes often adopt "the institutional trappings" of democracies such as constitutions. Constitutions in authoritarian states may serve a variety of roles, including "operating manual" (describing how the government is to function); "billboard" (signal of regime's intent), "blueprint" (outline of future regime plans), and "window dressing" (material designed to obfuscate, such as provisions setting forth freedoms that are not honored in practice). Authoritarian constitutions may help legitimize, strengthen, and consolidate regimes. An authoritarian constitution "that successfully coordinates government action and defines popular expectations can also help consolidate the regime's grip on power by inhibiting re coordination on a different set of arrangements." Unlike democratic constitutions, authoritarian constitutions do not set direct limits on executive authority; however, in some cases such documents may function as ways for elites to protect their own property rights or constrain autocrats' behavior.

The Soviet Russia Constitution of 1918, the first charter of the new Russian Socialist Federated Soviet Republic (RSFSR), was described by Vladimir Lenin as a "revolutionary" document. It was, he said, unlike any constitution drafted by a nation-state. The concept of "authoritarian constitutionalism" has been developed by legal scholar Mark Tushnet. Tushnet distinguishes authoritarian constitutionalist regimes from "liberal constitutionalist" regimes ("the sort familiar in the modern West, with core commitments to human rights and self-governance implemented by means of varying institutional devices") and from purely authoritarian regimes (which reject the idea of human rights or constraints on leaders' power). He describes authoritarian constitutionalist regimes as (1) authoritarian dominant-party states that (2) impose sanctions (such as libel judgments) against, but do not arbitrarily arrest, political dissidents; (3) permit "reasonably open discussion and criticism of its policies"; (4) hold "reasonably free and fair elections", without systemic intimidation, but "with close attention to such matters as the drawing of election districts and the creation of party lists to ensure as best it can that it will prevailand by a substantial margin"; (5) reflect at least occasional responsiveness to public opinion; and (6) create "mechanisms to ensure that the amount of dissent does not exceed the level it regards as desirable." Tushnet cites Singapore as an example of an authoritarian constitutionalist state, and connects the concept to that of hybrid regimes.

Economy 
Scholars such as Seymour Lipset, Carles Boix, Susan Stokes, Dietrich Rueschemeyer, Evelyne Stephens and John Stephens argue that economic development increases the likelihood of democratization. Adam Przeworski and Fernando Limongi argue that while economic development makes democracies less likely to turn authoritarian, there is insufficient evidence to conclude that development causes democratization (turning an authoritarian state into a democracy).

Eva Bellin argues that under certain circumstances the bourgeoise and labor are more likely to favor democratization, but less so under other circumstances. Economic development can boost public support for authoritarian regimes in the short-to-medium term.

According to Michael Albertus, most land reform programs tend to be implemented by authoritarian regimes that subsequently withhold property rights from the beneficiaries of the land reform. Authoritarian regimes do so to gain coercive leverage over rural populations.

Institutions 
Authoritarian regimes typically incorporate similar political institutions to that of democratic regimes, although they may serve different purposes. Democratic regimes are marked by institutions that are essential to economic development and individual freedom, including representative legislatures and competitive political parties. Most authoritarian regimes embrace these political structures, but use it in a way that reinforces their power.  Authoritarian legislatures, for example, are forums through which leaders may enhance their bases of support, share power, and monitor elites. Additionally, authoritarian party systems are extremely unstable and unconducive to party development, largely due to monopolistic patterns of authority.

Democratic and authoritarian arguably differ most prominently in their elections. Democratic elections are generally inclusive, competitive, and fair. In most instances, the elected leader is appointed to act on behalf of the general will. Authoritarian elections, on the other hand, are frequently subject to fraud and extreme constraints on the participation of opposing parties. Autocratic leaders employ tactics like murdering political opposition and paying election monitors to ensure victory. Despite this, the proportion of authoritarian regimes with elections and support parties has risen in recent years. This is largely due to the increasing popularity of democracies and electoral autocracies, leading authoritarian regimes to imitate democratic regimes in hopes of receiving foreign aid and dodging criticism.

According to a 2018 study, most party-led dictatorships regularly hold popular elections. Prior to the 1990s, most of these elections had no alternative parties or candidates for voters to choose. Since the end of the Cold War, about two-thirds of elections in authoritarian systems allow for some opposition, but the elections are structured in a way to heavily favor the incumbent authoritarian regime.

Hindrances to free and fair elections in authoritarian systems may include:
 Control of the media by the authoritarian incumbents.
 Interference with opposition campaigning.
 Electoral fraud.
 Violence against opposition.
 Large-scale spending by the state in favor of the incumbents.
 Permitting of some parties, but not others.
 Prohibitions on opposition parties, but not independent candidates.
 Allowing competition between candidates within the incumbent party, but not those who are not in the incumbent party.

Interactions with other elites and the masses 
The foundations of stable authoritarian rule are that the authoritarian prevents contestation from the masses and other elites. The authoritarian regime may use co-optation or repression (or carrots and sticks) to prevent revolts. Authoritarian rule entails a balancing act whereby the ruler has to maintain the support of other elites (frequently through the distribution of state and societal resources) and the support of the public (through distribution of the same resources): the authoritarian rule is at risk if the balancing act is lopsided, as it risks a coup by the elites or an uprising by the mass public.

Manipulation of information 
According to a 2019 study by Sergei Guriev and Daniel Treisman, authoritarian regimes have over time become less reliant on violence and mass repression to maintain control. The study shows instead that authoritarians have increasingly resorted to manipulation of information as a means of control. Authoritarians increasingly seek to create an appearance of good performance, conceal state repression, and imitate democracy.

Systemic weakness and resilience 
Andrew J. Nathan notes that "regime theory holds that authoritarian systems are inherently fragile because of weak legitimacy, overreliance on coercion, over-centralization of decision making, and the predominance of personal power over institutional norms. ... Few authoritarian regimesbe they communist, fascist, corporatist, or personalisthave managed to conduct orderly, peaceful, timely, and stable successions."

Political scientist Theodore M. Vestal writes that authoritarian political systems may be weakened through inadequate responsiveness to either popular or elite demands and that the authoritarian tendency to respond to challenges by exerting tighter control, instead of by adapting, may compromise the legitimacy of an authoritarian state and lead to its collapse.

One exception to this general trend is the endurance of the authoritarian rule of the Chinese Communist Party which has been unusually resilient among authoritarian regimes. Nathan posits that this can be attributed to four factors such as (1) "the increasingly norm-bound nature of its succession politics"; (2) "the increase in meritocratic as opposed to factional considerations in the promotion of political elites"; (3) "the differentiation and functional specialization of institutions within the regime"; and (4) "the establishment of institutions for political participation and appeal that strengthen the CCP's legitimacy among the public at large."

Violence 
Yale University political scientist Milan Svolik argues that violence is a common characteristic of authoritarian systems. Violence tends to be common in authoritarian states because of a lack of independent third parties empowered to settle disputes between the dictator, regime allies, regime soldiers and the masses.

Authoritarians may resort to measures referred to as coup-proofing (structures that make it hard for any small group to seize power). Coup-proofing strategies include strategically placing family, ethnic, and religious groups in the military; creating of an armed force parallel to the regular military; and developing multiple internal security agencies with overlapping jurisdiction that constantly monitor one another. Research shows that some coup-proofing strategies reduce the risk of coups occurring and reduce the likelihood of mass protests. However, coup-proofing reduces military effectiveness, and limits the rents that an incumbent can extract. A 2016 study shows that the implementation of succession rules reduce the occurrence of coup attempts. Succession rules are believed to hamper coordination efforts among coup plotters by assuaging elites who have more to gain by patience than by plotting. According to political scientists Curtis Bell and Jonathan Powell, coup attempts in neighbouring countries lead to greater coup-proofing and coup-related repression in a region. A 2017 study finds that countries' coup-proofing strategies are heavily influenced by other countries with similar histories. A 2018 study in the Journal of Peace Research found that leaders who survive coup attempts and respond by purging known and potential rivals are likely to have longer tenures as leaders. A 2019 study in Conflict Management and Peace Science found that personalist dictatorships are more likely to take coup-proofing measures than other authoritarian regimes; the authors argue that this is because "personalists are characterized by weak institutions and narrow support bases, a lack of unifying ideologies and informal links to the ruler."

According to a 2019 study, personalist dictatorships are more repressive than other forms of dictatorship.

Typologies 
According to Yale professor Juan José Linz there a three main types of political regimes today: democracies,
totalitarian regimes and, sitting between these two, authoritarian regimes (with hybrid regimes).

Similar terms
 An authoritarian regime has "a concentration of power in a leader or an elite not constitutionally responsible to the people". Unlike totalitarian states, they will allow social and economic institutions not under governmental control, and tend to rely on passive mass acceptance rather than active popular support.
 An Autocracy is a state/government in which one person possesses "unlimited power".
 A Totalitarian state is "based on subordination of the individual to the state and strict control of all aspects of the life and productive capacity of the nation especially by coercive measures (such as censorship and terrorism)". and are ruled by a single ruling party made up of loyal supporters. Unlike autocracies, which "seek only to gain absolute political power and to outlaw opposition", totalitarian states are characterized by an official ideology, which "seek only to gain absolute political power and to outlaw opposition", and "seek to dominate every aspect of everyone's life as a prelude to world domination".
 A Fascist state is autocratic and based on a political philosophy/movement, (such as that of the Fascisti of pre-WWII Italy) "that exalts nation and often race above the individual and that stands for a centralized autocratic government headed by a dictatorial leader, severe economic and social regimentation, and forcible suppression of opposition".

Subtypes
Several subtypes of authoritarian regimes have been identified by Linz and others. Linz identified the two most basic subtypes as traditional authoritarian regimes and bureaucratic-military authoritarian regimes:
 Traditional authoritarian regimes are those "in which the ruling authority (generally a single person)" is maintained in power "through a combination of appeals to traditional legitimacy, patron-client ties and repression, which is carried out by an apparatus bound to the ruling authority through personal loyalties." An example is Ethiopia under Haile Selassie I.
 Bureaucratic-military authoritarian regimes are those "governed by a coalition of military officers and technocrats who act pragmatically (rather than ideologically) within the limits of their bureaucratic mentality." Mark J. Gasiorowski suggests that it is best to distinguish "simple military authoritarian regimes" from "bureaucratic authoritarian regimes" in which "a powerful group of technocrats uses the state apparatus to try to rationalize and develop the economy" such South Korea under Park Chung-hee.
According to Barbara Geddes, there are seven typologies of authoritarian regimes: dominant party regimes, military regime, personalist regimes, monarchies, oligarchic regimes, indirect military regimes, or hybrids of the first three.

Subtypes of authoritarian regimes identified by Linz are corporatist or organic-statistic, racial and ethnic "democracy" and post-totalitarian.
 Corporatist authoritarian regimes "are those in which corporatism institutions are used extensively by the state to coopt and demobilize powerful interest groups." This type has been studied most extensively in Latin America.
 Racial and ethnic "democracies" are those in which "certain racial or ethnic groups enjoy full democratic rights while others are largely or entirely denied those rights", such as in South Africa under apartheid.
 Post-totalitarian authoritarian regimes are those in which totalitarian institutions (such as the party, secret police and state-controlled mass media) remain, but where "ideological orthodoxy has declined in favor of routinization, repression has declined, the state's top leadership is less personalized and more secure, and the level of mass mobilization has declined substantially." Examples include the Russian Federation and Soviet Eastern Bloc states in the mid-1980s. The post-Mao Zedong People's Republic of China was viewed as post-totalitarian in the 1990s and early 2000s, with a limited degree of increase in pluralism and civil society. however, in the 2010s, particularly after Xi Jinping succeeded as General Secretary of the Chinese Communist Party and rose to power in 2012, Chinese state repression sharply increased, aided by digital control and mass surveillance.

Authoritarian regimes are also sometimes subcategorized by whether they are personalistic or populist. Personalistic authoritarian regimes are characterized by arbitrary rule and authority exercised "mainly through patronage networks and coercion rather than through institutions and formal rules." Personalistic authoritarian regimes have been seen in post-colonial Africa. By contrast, populist authoritarian regimes "are mobilizational regimes in which a strong, charismatic, manipulative leader rules through a coalition involving key lower-class groups." Examples include Argentina under Juan Perón, Egypt under Gamal Abdel Nasser and Venezuela under Hugo Chávez and Nicolás Maduro.

A typology of authoritarian regimes by political scientists Brian Lai and Dan Slater includes four categories:
 machine (oligarchic party dictatorships);
 bossism (autocratic party dictatorships);
 juntas (oligarchic military dictatorships); and
 strongman (autocratic military dictatorships).
Lai and Slater argue that single‐party regimes are better than military regimes at developing institutions (e.g. mass mobilization, patronage networks ad coordination of elites) that are effective at continuing the regime's incumbency and diminishing domestic challengers; Lai and Slater also argue that military regimes more often initiate military conflicts or undertake other "desperate measures" to maintain control as compared to single‐party regimes.

John Duckitt suggests a link between authoritarianism and collectivism, asserting that both stand in opposition to individualism. Duckitt writes that both authoritarianism and collectivism submerge individual rights and goals to group goals, expectations and conformities.

According to Steven Levitsky and Lucan Way, authoritarian regimes that are created in social revolutions are far more durable than other kinds of authoritarian regimes.

Authoritarianism and democracy 

Authoritarianism and democracy are not necessarily fundamental opposites and may be thought of as poles at opposite ends of a scale, so that it is possible for some democracies to possess authoritarian elements, and for an authoritarian system to have democratic elements. Authoritarian regimes may also be partly responsive to citizen grievances, although this is generally only regarding grievances that do not undermine the stability of the regime. An illiberal democracy, or procedural democracy, is distinguished from liberal democracy, or substantive democracy, in that illiberal democracies lack features such as the rule of law, protections for minority groups, an independent judiciary and the real separation of powers.

A further distinction that liberal democracies have rarely made war with one another; research has extended the theory and finds that more democratic countries tend to have few wars (sometimes called militarized interstate disputes) causing fewer battle deaths with one another and that democracies have far fewer civil wars.

Research shows that the democratic nations have much less democide or murder by government. Those were also moderately developed nations before applying liberal democratic policies. Research by the World Bank suggests that political institutions are extremely important in determining the prevalence of corruption and that parliamentary systems, political stability and freedom of the press are all associated with lower corruption.

A 2006 study by economist Alberto Abadie has concluded that terrorism is most common in nations with intermediate political freedom. The nations with the least terrorism are the most and least democratic nations, and that "transitions from an authoritarian regime to a democracy may be accompanied by temporary increases in terrorism." Studies in 2013 and 2017 similarly found a nonlinear relationship between political freedom and terrorism, with the most terrorist attacks occurring in partial democracies and the fewest in "strict autocracies and full-fledged democracies." A 2018 study by Amichai Magen demonstrated that liberal democracies and polyarchies not only suffer fewer terrorist attacks as compared to other regime types, but also suffer fewer casualties in terrorist attacks as compared to other regime types, which may be attributed to higher-quality democracies' responsiveness to their citizens' demands, including "the desire for physical safety", resulting in "investment in intelligence, infrastructure protection, first responders, social resilience, and specialized medical care" which averts casualties. Magen also stated that terrorism in closed autocracies sharply increased starting in 2013.

Within national democratic governments, there may be subnational authoritarian enclaves. A prominent examples of this includes the Southern United States after Reconstruction, as well as areas of contemporary Argentina and Mexico.

Competitive authoritarian regimes 
Another type of authoritarian regime is the competitive authoritarian regime, a type of civilian regime that arose in the post-Cold War era. In a competitive authoritarian regime, "formal democratic institutions exist and are widely viewed as the primary means of gaining power, but ... incumbents' abuse of the state places them at a significant advantage vis-à-vis their opponents." The term was coined by Steven Levitsky and Lucan A. Way in their 2010 book of the same name to discuss a type of hybrid regime that emerged during and after the Cold War.

Competitive authoritarian regimes differ from fully authoritarian regimes in that elections are regularly held, the opposition can openly operate without a high risk of exile or imprisonment and "democratic procedures are sufficiently meaningful for opposition groups to take them seriously as arenas through which to contest for power." Competitive authoritarian regimes lack one or more of the three characteristics of democracies such as free elections (i.e. elections untainted by substantial fraud or voter intimidation); protection of civil liberties (i.e. the freedom of speech, press and association) and an even playing field (in terms of access to resources, the media and legal recourse).

Authoritarianism and fascism 
Authoritarianism is considered a core concept of fascism and scholars agree that a fascist regime is foremost an authoritarian form of government, although not all authoritarian regimes are fascist. While authoritarianism is a defining characteristic of fascism, scholars argue that more distinguishing traits are needed to make an authoritarian regime fascist.

Authoritarianism and totalitarianism 

Linz distinguished new forms of authoritarianism from personalistic dictatorships and totalitarian states, taking Francoist Spain as an example. Unlike personalistic dictatorships, new forms of authoritarianism have institutionalized representation of a variety of actors (in Spain's case, including the military, the Catholic Church, Falange, monarchists, technocrats and others). Unlike totalitarian states, the regime relies on passive mass acceptance rather than popular support. According to Juan Linz the distinction between an authoritarian regime and a  totalitarian one is that an authoritarian regime seeks to suffocate politics and political mobilization while totalitarianism seeks to control and utilize them. Authoritarianism primarily differs from totalitarianism in that social and economic institutions exist that are not under governmental control. Building on the work of Yale political scientist Juan Linz, Paul C. Sondrol of the University of Colorado at Colorado Springs has examined the characteristics of authoritarian and totalitarian dictators and organized them in a chart:

Sondrol argues that while both authoritarianism and totalitarianism are forms of autocracy, they differ in three key dichotomies:

Compared to totalitarianism, "the authoritarian state still maintains a certain distinction between state and society. It is only concerned with political power and as long as that is not contested it gives society a certain degree of liberty. Totalitarianism, on the other hand, invades private life and asphyxiates it." Another distinction is that "authoritarianism is not animated by utopian ideals in the way totalitarianism is. It does not attempt to change the world and human nature." Carl Joachim Friedrich writes that "a totalist ideology, a party reinforced by a secret police, and monopoly control of ... industrial mass society" are the three features of totalitarian regimes that distinguish them from other autocracies.

Greg Yudin, a professor of political philosophy at the Moscow School of Social and Economic Sciences, argues "political passivity and civic disengagement" are "key features" of authoritarianism, while totalitarianism relies on "mass mobilization, terror and homogeneity of beliefs".

Economic effects 
The effects of political regime types on economic growth have been debated by scholars. A 1993 assessment of existing scholarship led Adam Przeworski and Fernando Limongi to conclude, "we do not know whether democracy fosters or hinders economic growth." In 2010, Dani Rodrik wrote that democracies outperform autocracies in terms of long-term economic growth, economic stability, adjustments to external economic shocks, human capital investment, and economic equality. A 2019 study by Daron Acemoglu, Suresh Naidu, Pascual Restrepo, and James A. Robinson found that democracy increases GDP per capita by about 20 percent over the long-term. According to Amartya Sen, no functioning liberal democracy has ever suffered a large-scale famine.

Scholars have identified that autocracies may have an advantage when it comes to rapid industrialization. Seymour Martin Lipset argued that low-income authoritarian regimes have certain technocratic "efficiency-enhancing advantages" over low-income democracies that gives authoritarian regimes an advantage in economic development. By contrast, Morton H. Halperin, Joseph T. Siegle and Michael M. Weinstein (2005) argue that democracies "realize superior development performance" over authoritarianism, pointing out that poor democracies are more likely to have steadier economic growth and less likely to experience economic and humanitarian catastrophes (such as refugee crises) than authoritarian regimes; that civil liberties in democracies act as a curb on corruption and misuse of resources; and that democracies are more adaptable than authoritarian regimes.

Studies suggest that several health indicators (life expectancy and infant and maternal mortality) have a stronger and more significant association with democracy than they have with GDP per capita, size of the public sector or income inequality.

Historical trends

Post-World War II anti-authoritarianism 

Both World War II (ending in 1945) and the Cold War (ending in 1991) resulted in the replacement of authoritarian regimes by either democratic regimes or regimes that were less authoritarian.

World War II saw the defeat of the Axis powers by the Allied powers. All the Axis powers (Nazi Germany, Fascist Italy and Imperial Japan) had totalitarian or authoritarian governments, and two of the three were replaced by governments based on democratic constitutions. The Allied powers were an alliance of Democratic states and (later) the Communist Soviet Union. At least in Western Europe the initial post-war era embraced pluralism and freedom of expression in areas that had been under control of authoritarian regimes. The memory of fascism and Nazism was denigrated. The new Federal Republic of Germany banned its expression. In reaction to the centralism of the Nazi state, the new constitution of West Germany (Federal Republic of Germany) exercised "separation of powers" and placed "law enforcement firmly in the hands" of the sixteen Länder or states of the republic, not with the federal German government, at least not at first.

Culturally there was also a strong sense of anti-authoritarianism based on anti-fascism in Western Europe. This was attributed to the active resistance from occupation and to fears arising from the development of superpowers. Anti-authoritarianism also became associated with countercultural and bohemian movements such as the Beat Generation in the 1950s, the hippies in the 1960s and punks in the 1970s.

In South America, Argentina, Bolivia, Brazil, Paraguay, Chile and Uruguay moved away from dictatorships to democracy between 1982 and 1990.

With the fall of the Berlin Wall in 1989 and the Soviet Union in 1991, the other authoritarian/totalitarian "half" of the Allied Powers of World War II collapsed. This led not so much to revolt against authority in general, but to the belief that authoritarian states (and state control of economies) were outdated. The idea that "liberal democracy was the final form toward which all political striving was directed" became very popular in Western countries and was celebrated in Francis Fukuyama's book The End of History and the Last Man. According to Charles H. Fairbanks Jr., "all the new states that stumbled out of the ruins of the Soviet bloc, except Uzbekistan and Turkmenistan, seemed indeed to be moving towards democracy in the early 1990s" as were the countries of East Central Europe and the Balkans.

In December 2010, the Arab Spring arose in response to unrest over economic stagnation but also in opposition to oppressive authoritarian regimes, first in Tunisia, and spreading to Libya, Egypt, Yemen, Syria, Bahrain and elsewhere. Regimes were toppled in Tunisia, Libya, Egypt and partially in Yemen while other countries saw riots, civil wars or insurgencies. Most Arab Spring revolutions failed to lead to enduring democratization. In the decade following the Arab Spring, of the countries in which an autocracy was toppled in the Arab spring, only Tunisia had become a genuine democracy; Egypt backslid to return to a military-run authoritarian state, while Libya, Syria and Yemen experienced devastating civil wars.

2000s authoritarian revival 

Since 2005, observers noted what some have called a "democratic recession", although some such as Steven Levitsky and Lucan Way have disputed that there was a significant democratic decline before 2013. In 2018, the Freedom House declared that from 2006 to 2018 "113 countries" around the world showed "a net decline" in "political rights and civil liberties" while "only 62" experienced "a net improvement." Its 2020 report marked the fourteenth consecutive year of declining scores. By 2020, all countries marked as "not free" by Freedom House had also developed practices of transnational authoritarianism, aiming to police and control dissent beyond state borders. 

Writing in 2018, American political journalist David Frum stated: "The hopeful world of the very late 20th centurythe world of NAFTA and an expanding NATO; of the World Wide Web 1.0 and liberal interventionism; of the global spread of democracy under leaders such as Václav Havel and Nelson Mandelanow looks battered and delusive."

Michael Ignatieff wrote that Fukuyama's idea of liberalism vanquishing authoritarianism "now looks like a quaint artifact of a vanished unipolar moment" and Fukuyama himself expressed concern. By 2018, only one Arab Spring uprising (that in Tunisia) resulted in a transition to constitutional democratic governance and a "resurgence of authoritarianism and Islamic extremism" in the region was dubbed the Arab Winter.

Various explanations have been offered for the new spread of authoritarianism. They include the downside of globalization, and the subsequent rise of populist neo-nationalism, and the success of the Beijing Consensus, i.e. the authoritarian model of the People's Republic of China. In countries such as the United States, factors blamed for the growth of authoritarianism include the financial crisis of 2007–2008 and slower real wage growth as well as social media's elimination of so-called "gatekeepers" of knowledge – the equivalent of disintermediation in economics – so that a large fraction of the population considers to be opinion what were once "viewed as verifiable facts" – including everything from the danger of global warming to the preventing the spread of disease through vaccination – and considers to be fact what are actually only unproven fringe opinions.

In United States politics, the terms "extreme right", "far-right", and "ultra-right" are labels used to describe "militant forms of insurgent revolutionary right ideology and separatist ethnocentric nationalism", such as Christian Identity, the Creativity Movement, the Ku Klux Klan, the National Socialist Movement, the National Alliance, the Joy of Satan Ministries, and the Order of Nine Angles. These far-right groups share conspiracist views of power which are overwhelmingly anti-Semitic and reject pluralist democracy in favour of an organic oligarchy that would unite the perceived homogeneously racial Völkish nation. The far-right in the United States is composed of various Neo-fascist, Neo-Nazi, White nationalist, and White supremacist organizations and networks who have been known to refer to an "acceleration" of racial conflict through violent means such as assassinations, murders, terrorist attacks, and societal collapse, in order to achieve the building of a White ethnostate.

Examples 

There is no one consensus definition of authoritarianism, but several annual measurements are attempted, including Freedom House's annual Freedom in the World report. Some countries such as Venezuela, among others, that are currently or historically recognized as authoritarian did not become authoritarian upon taking power or fluctuated between an authoritarian, flawed, and Hybrid regime due to periods of democratic backsliding and/or democratization. The time period reflects their time in power rather than the years they were authoritarian regimes. Some countries such as China and fascist regimes have also been characterized as totalitarian, with some periods being depicted as more authoritarian, or totalitarian, than others.

Current 
The following is a non-exhaustive list of examples of states which are currently or frequently characterized as authoritarian and/or democratically backsliding. Some countries listed may also be currently listed as a "Hybrid regime" or "flawed democracy" by The Economist's Democracy Index, or partly free by Freedom House's Freedom in the World index.

Historical 
The following is a non-exhaustive list of examples of states which were historically authoritarian.

See also 

 Authoritarian capitalism
 Authoritarian socialism
 Criticism of democracy
 Left-wing dictatorship
 Right-wing dictatorship
 Absolute monarchy
 One-party state
 Autocracy
 Criticism of liberal democracy
 Managed democracy

References
Informational notes

Citations

Bibliography
 Linz, Juan J. (1964). "An Authoritarian Regime: The Case of Spain". In Allard, Eric; Littunen, Yrjo. Cleavages, Ideologies and Party Systems. Helsinki: Academic Bookstore.

Further reading
 Frantz; Erica; Geddes, Barbara; Wrights, Joseph (2018). How Dictatorships Work. Cambridge: Cambridge University Press. .

External links 
 

 
Authority
Political culture
Political theories
Social theories